An anti-materiel rifle (AMR) is a rifle designed for use against military equipment, structures, and other hardware (materiel). Anti-materiel rifles are chambered in significantly larger calibers than conventional rifles and are employed to eliminate equipment such as engines and unarmored or lightly armored targets. While modern armored vehicles are resistant to anti-materiel rifles, the extended range and penetration still has many modern applications. While not intended for use against human targets, the bullet weight and velocity of anti-materiel rifles gives them exceptional long-range capability even when compared with designated sniper rifles. Anti-materiel rifles are made in both bolt-action as well as semi-automatic designs.

The anti-materiel rifle originated in the anti-tank rifles, which itself originated during World War I. While modern tanks and most other armored vehicles are too well protected to be affected by anti-materiel rifles, the guns are still effective for attacking unarmored or lightly armored vehicles. They can also be used against stationary enemy aircraft, missile launchers, radar equipment, small watercraft, communications equipment, crew served weapons and similar targets. Their value lies in their ability to precisely target and disable enemy assets from long range at relatively low cost.

Despite having been designed to be used against equipment, anti-materiel rifles have also been used for killing soldiers from distances that are beyond the effective range of rifle-caliber cartridges. Anti-materiel rifles can also penetrate most obstacles and building materials, making them viable for engaging targets behind cover that is usually hard enough to stop rifle-caliber cartridges.

The offensive use of anti-materiel rifles or special application scoped rifles (SASR) is termed hard target interdiction (HTI) by the United States military.

Anti-materiel rifles can also be used in non-offensive rolesfor example, for safely destroying unexploded ordnance.

History

World War I 

The history of anti-materiel rifles dates back to World War I. The need for anti-tank rifles was first encountered by the Germans when faced with the British Mark 1 tank.

As a counter, the Germans first used "direct fire mortars", which were mortars aimed at low angles pointing towards enemy tanks. Later, the Germans developed the T-Gewehr anti-tank rifle, which can be credited with being the first anti-materiel rifle. The rifle was designed to penetrate the thick armor of the British tanks. This weapon had a two-man crew: one to load and the other to fire the weapon, although they often switched roles. The recoil of this weapon was so high that it was known to break collar bones and dislocate shoulders. The rifle fired a steel core armor-piercing round specifically designed to be used with this rifle.

World War II 

During World War II, anti-materiel guns were widely used. The British Boys anti-tank rifle was used to great effect against lightly-armored tanks, but was soon replaced by the PIAT due to its ineffectiveness against more armored tanks. In September 1939 Polish army used the Wz. 35 anti-tank rifle, around 800 of which were captured by Germans and put into service as Panzerbüchse 35(p). The PTRD-41 and PTRS-41 anti-tank rifles were used by the Soviets on the Eastern Front. Germany used the Panzerbüchse 39, while Japan used the Type 97 automatic cannon, though the latter became obsolete by 1942. Notably, the United States did not develop or field any anti-tank rifles during the war, choosing instead to use explosive anti-tank weaponry such as the M1 Bazooka.

One anti-tank rifle used was the Lahti L-39, a Finnish anti-materiel rifle. One version was designed to fire a 13.2 mm cartridge and another a 20 mm cartridge. There was debate over which was more effective at piercing armor. Some argued that the smaller cartridge travelled faster and could penetrate deeper into the armor, while others believed that the higher caliber rounds would cause greater damage.

Cold War 
During the Cold War, the Barrett M82 rifle was produced by the United States, and was chambered to fire a .50 BMG (12.7x99mm NATO) round. This weapon was sold by the U.S. to Swedish forces.

Gulf War 
The M82 rifle first saw action in the early 1990s, during the Gulf War. The U.S. Marine Corps initially purchased around 125 M82 rifles; orders from the Army and Air Force followed. These weapons were used with rounds such as armor piercing incendiary rounds (API) which were effective against such targets as buildings, trucks, and parked aircraft. The purpose of this round was to penetrate non-armored vehicles and burst into flames on impact. Saboted light armor penetrator ammunition was also used in anti-materiel rifles during the conflict.

Modern day 
In the modern era, the armor of tanks and other vehicles increased, making it difficult for .50 BMG bullets to penetrate. Modern day anti-materiel rifles are used to penetrate light armor vehicles or targets such as concrete barricades and buildings as well as being used to destroy unexploded ordnance. One of the most popular anti-materiel rifles today is the Barrett M107, not only for its military use but also its civilian availability. This is due to the design of the weapon, being built with a suppressor-ready muzzle brake, a thermal cheek pad, and a hand grip mounted on the inside of the rail. Other popular anti-materiel rifles include the Zastava M93 Black arrow, McMillan Tac-50, Gepard GM6 Lynx, AMSD OM 50 Nemesis, Accuracy International AS50, Mechem NTW-20, Istiglal IST-14.5, WKW Wilk and the CheyTac Intervention M-200.

Description 

Anti-materiel rifles are primarily for use against military equipment rather than personnel. The type and size of ammunition defines a rifle as anti-materiel. When used with conventional ball or target ammunition the rifle does not have any anti-materiel capability above and beyond that of any other high velocity, large calibre rifle. The Saint Petersburg Declaration of 1868 deemed explosive rounds to be inhumane in use against personnel, but they can be employed against materiel. The size of the bullet also plays a factor in the definition. Most modern militaries use rifles that fire in 5.56mm or 7.62mm round, while anti-materiel rifles tend to fire a 12.7-mm round with the capacity for greater destruction and penetration.

In general, anti-materiel rifles are chambered for 12.7×99 mm NATO (.50 BMG), 12.7×108 mm Russian, 14.5×114 mm Russian, and 20 mm cartridges. The large cartridges are required to be able to fire projectiles containing usable payloads, such as explosives, armor-piercing cores, incendiaries, or combinations of these, as found in the Raufoss Mk 211 projectile.

The recoil produced by the cartridges employed dictates that these rifles are designed to be fired from the prone position.  Bipods and monopods and muzzle brakes are used as accessories to employ these rifles as comfortably and accurately as possible. Firing several 12.7×99 mm NATO, 12.7×108 mm Russian, or larger caliber shots from the (unsupported) standing position or in a kneeling position would be very uncomfortable for the operator and can result in them being knocked over or sustaining a shoulder injury.

Two- to three-man sniper teams are required when using an anti-materiel rifle, due to its size and weight, as well as its possible range. According to the US Army, the range of a standard sniper rifle firing a 7.62x51 mm NATO round is a distance of about  while the Barrett's effective range is  against personnel targets, and  against materiel targets.

See also
 Designated marksman rifle
List of anti-materiel rifles
List of firearms
Wall gun
 High-explosive incendiary/armor-piercing ammunition
 Anti-tank gun
 Man-portable air-defense system
 Grenade launcher

References

External links

 20mm AMR – New Use for Unused Ammo, SOF Weapons SectionCrane Division, Naval Surface Warfare CenterSmall Arms Weapons Systems Division, USSOCOM Comparative Testing Office

Anti-materiel rifles
Sniper rifles
Rifles